Peter and the Wolf Op. 67, a "symphonic fairy tale for children", is a musical composition written by Sergei Prokofiev in 1936. The narrator tells a children's story, while the orchestra illustrates it by using different instruments to play a "theme" that represents each character in the story. It is Prokofiev's most frequently performed work and one of the most frequently performed works in the entire classical repertoire.

Background
In 1936, Prokofiev was commissioned by Natalya Sats, the director of the Central Children's Theatre in Moscow, to write a musical symphony for children. Sats and Prokofiev had become acquainted after he visited her theatre with his sons several times. The intent was to introduce children to the individual instruments of the orchestra. The first draft of the libretto was about a Young Pioneer (the Soviet version of a Boy Scout) called Peter who rights a wrong by challenging an adult. Prokofiev wrote a new version where Peter captures a wolf. As well as promoting desired Pioneer virtues such as vigilance, bravery, and resourcefulness, the plot illustrates Soviet themes such as the stubbornness of the un-Bolshevik older generation (the grandfather) and the triumph of Man (Peter) taming Nature (the wolf).

Prokofiev produced a version for the piano in under a week, finishing it on April 15. The orchestration was finished on April 24. The work was first performed at a children's concert in the main hall of the Moscow Conservatory with the Moscow Philharmonic on 2 May 1936. However, Sats was ill and the substitute narrator was inexperienced, and the performance failed to attract much attention. Later that month a much more successful performance with Sats narrating was given at the Moscow Pioneers Palace. The American premiere took place in March 1938, with Prokofiev himself conducting the Boston Symphony Orchestra at Symphony Hall, Boston with Richard Hale narrating. By that time Sats was serving a sentence in the gulag, where she was sent after her lover Marshal Mikhail Tukhachevsky was shot in June 1937.

Plot
Peter, a Young Soviet Pioneer, lives at his grandfather's home in a forest clearing. One day, Peter goes out into the clearing, leaving the garden gate open, and a duck that lives in the yard takes the opportunity to go swimming in a pond nearby. The duck and a bird argue on whether a proper bird should be able to swim or fly. A local cat stalks them quietly, and the bird—warned by Peter—flies to safety in a tall tree while the duck swims to safety in the middle of the pond.

Before long, Peter's grandfather scolds him for being outside and playing in the meadow alone because a wolf might come out of the forest and attack him. When Peter shows defiance, believing he has nothing to fear from wolves, his grandfather takes him back into the house and locks the gate. Soon afterwards, a ferocious grey wolf does indeed come out of the forest. The cat quickly climbs into the tree with the bird, but the duck, who has jumped out of the pond, is chased, overtaken, and swallowed by the beast.

Seeing all of this from inside, Peter fetches a rope and climbs over the garden wall into the tree. He asks the bird to fly around the beast's head to distract him, while he lowers a noose and catches the wolf by his tail. The beast struggles to get free, but Peter ties the rope to the tree and the noose only gets tighter.

Some hunters, who have been tracking the wolf, come out of the forest with their guns readied, but Peter gets them to instead help him take it to a zoo in a victory parade (the piece was first performed for an audience of Young Pioneers during May Day celebrations) that includes himself, the bird, the hunters leading the wolf, the cat, and lastly his grumbling Grandfather, still disappointed that Peter ignored his warnings, but proud that his grandson caught the beast.

At the end, the narrator states those listening carefully could hear the duck still quacking inside the wolf's belly, due to being swallowed whole.

Performance directions

Prokofiev produced detailed performance notes in both English and Russian for Peter and the Wolf. According to the English version:

Instrumentation
Peter and the Wolf is scored for the following orchestra:
Woodwinds: a flute, an oboe, a clarinet in A, and a bassoon
Brass: 3 horns in F, a trumpet in B and a trombone
Percussion: timpani, a triangle, a tambourine, cymbals, castanets, a snare drum, and a bass drum
Strings: first and second violins, violas, violoncellos, and double basses

Each character in the story has a particular instrument and a musical theme:
Bird Flute

Duck Oboe

Cat Clarinet

Grandfather Bassoon

Wolf French horns

Hunters woodwind and trumpet theme, with gunshots on timpani and bass drum

Peter string instruments (including violin, viola, cello, and double bass)

A performance lasts about 25 minutes.

Recordings

According to an article by Jeremy Nicholas for the classical music magazine Gramophone in 2015, the best overall recording of Peter and the Wolf is by the New Philharmonia Orchestra, narrated by Richard Baker and conducted by Raymond Leppard in 1971. Gramophones best DVD version is the 2006 film by Suzie Templeton; its music is performed, without narrator, by the Philharmonia Orchestra conducted by Mark Stephenson.

Adaptations of the work

Walt Disney, 1946

Prokofiev, while touring the West in 1938, visited Los Angeles and met Walt Disney. Prokofiev performed the piano version of Peter and the Wolf for "le papa de Mickey Mouse" (French for "Mickey Mouse's dad"), as Prokofiev described him in a letter to his sons. Disney was impressed, and considered adding an animated version of Peter and the Wolf to Fantasia, which was to be released in 1940. Due to World War II, these plans fell through, and it was not until 1946 that Disney released his adaptation of Peter and the Wolf narrated by Sterling Holloway. It is not known if Prokofiev, by that point behind the Iron Curtain, was aware of this. It was released theatrically as a segment of Make Mine Music, then reissued the next year, accompanying a reissue of Fantasia (as a short subject before the film), then separately on home video in the 1990s.
This version makes several changes to the original story. For example:
 During the character introduction, the pets are given names: Sasha the songbird, Sonia the duck, and Ivan the cat.
 As the cartoon begins, Peter and his friends already know there is a wolf nearby and are preparing to catch him.
 The hunters get names in a later part of the story: Misha, Yasha, and Vladimir.
 Peter daydreams of hunting and catching the wolf, and for that purpose exits the garden carrying a wooden pop gun.
 At the end, in a reversal of the original (and to make the story more child-friendly), the narrator reveals that the duck Sonia has  been eaten by the wolf. Earlier in the film, the wolf is shown chasing Sonia, who hides in an old tree's hollow trunk. The wolf attacks out of view and returns in view with some of her feathers in his mouth, licking his jaws. Peter, Ivan, and Sasha assume Sonia has been eaten. After the wolf has been caught, Sasha is shown mourning Sonia. She comes out of the tree trunk at that point, and they are happily reunited.

In 1957, for one of his television programs, Disney recalled how Prokofiev himself visited the Disney studio, eventually inspiring the making of this animated version. Disney used pianist Ingolf Dahl, who resembled Prokofiev, to re-create how the composer sat at a piano and played the themes from the score.

British–Polish co-production, 2006
In 2006, Suzie Templeton and Hugh Welchman directed and produced respectively, a stop-motion animated adaptation, Peter & the Wolf. It is unusual in its lack of any dialogue or narration, the story being told only in images and sound and interrupted by sustained periods of silence. The soundtrack is performed by the Philharmonia Orchestra, and the film received its premiere with a live accompaniment in the Royal Albert Hall. The film won the Annecy Cristal and the Audience Award at the 2007 Annecy International Animated Film Festival, and won the 2007 Academy Award for Best Animated Short Film. This version makes some changes to the original Prokofiev story; for example:
 Peter bumps into one of the "hunters" (teenage bullies in this telling), who throws him in a rubbish bin and aims at him with his rifle to scare him; the second hunter watches without interfering (thus, a dislike towards the hunter/bullies is immediately created).
 Because of a broken wing, the bird has trouble flying and takes Peter's balloon to help it get aloft.
 After Peter has captured the wolf in a net, the hunter gets him in his rifle's telescopic sight coincidentally, but just before shooting, the second hunter stumbles, falls on him and makes him miss the shot.
 The caged wolf is brought into the village on a cart, where Peter's grandfather tries to sell it. The hunter comes to the container and sticks his rifle in to intimidate the animal (as he did with Peter earlier on). At that time Peter throws the net on the hunter, who becomes tangled in it.
 Before the grandfather has made a deal, Peter unlocks the cart after looking into the eyes of the wolf. They walk side by side through the awestruck crowd and then the freed wolf runs off in the direction of the silver moon shining over the forest.

Others

Up to 1959
 In 1958, a videotaped television special entitled Art Carney Meets Peter and the Wolf, with Art Carney as main entertainer, along with the Bil Baird Marionettes, was presented by the American Broadcasting Company, and was successful enough to have been repeated twice. The show had an original storyline in which Carney interacted with some talking marionette animals, notably the wolf, who was the troublemaker of the group. This first half was presented as a musical, with adapted music from Lieutenant Kijé and other Prokofiev works which had special English lyrics fitted into them. The program then segued into a complete performance of Peter and the Wolf, played exactly as written by the composer, and "mimed" by both "human" and "animal" marionettes. The conclusion of the program again featured Carney interacting with the animal marionettes. The show was nominated for three Emmy Awards.

1960s
 Circa 1960, Hans Conried recorded the narration with a Dixieland musical band. Because a Dixieland band uses different instruments than an orchestra, Peter is played by the trumpets, the Bird is played by a clarinet, the Duck by a banjo, the Cat by a "cool cat" tenor saxophone, the Wolf by a tuba, the Hunters by the percussive ensemble, and Grandfather by a slide trombone. The characters of the Bee and the Flea are briefly introduced to demonstrate the "versatility of our chief percussionist" (played by a xylophone and glockenspiel, respectively).
 The Clyde Valley Stompers recorded a jazz version on Parlophone Records (45-R 4928) in 1962, which registered on the popular music charts of the time.
 Allan Sherman parodied the work in the album Peter and the Commissar (1964), made with Arthur Fiedler and the Boston Pops Orchestra.
 In 1966, Hammond organ player Jimmy Smith performed for a jazz album arranged by Oliver Nelson without the narration, but based on the original themes.
 In 1969, American-Canadian filmmaker Caroline Leaf used sand animation to adapt the work in Sand or Peter and the Wolf, her first film.

1980s
 American film and television actor Ray Bolger served as the narrator for a 1981 live-action version with real animals, directed by Dan Bessie and produced by Pyramid Media. The music was performed by the Santa Cruz Chamber Orchestra conducted by Dr. Lewis Keizer.
 The 1983 film A Christmas Story features music from Peter and the Wolf prominently during scenes of the character Scott Farkus bullying other characters. The surname Farkus is a variation of farkas, which is Hungarian for "wolf".
 Justin Locke wrote a 1985 sequel to the story, using the original score. Peter VS. the Wolf is the Wolf's trial, where he defends himself against the charge of "Duckicide in the first degree, with one gulp." The original music is presented as evidence, but then the Wolf calls individual musicians to the stand and cross-examines them. It requires five actors for a stage presentation.
 In 1985, Arnie Zane choreographed a punk music ballet version of Peter and the Wolf.
 In 1988, "Weird Al" Yankovic and Wendy Carlos produced a comedic version, using a synthesized orchestra and many additions to the story and music (e.g., Peter captures the wolf using his grandfather's dental floss, leading to the moral of the story: "Oral hygiene is very important").
 In 1989, in an episode of the Muppet Babies entitled "Skeeter and the Wolf", Skeeter fills in for Peter, Gonzo is the bird, Scooter is the cat, Fozzie is the duck, Nanny is the grandparent, and Kermit and Piggy are the hunters.

1990s
 A 1990 episode of Tiny Toon Adventures titled "Buster and the Wolverine" featured Elmyra Duff providing narration for a story wherein Buster Bunny and his friends, represented with musical instruments, combat an evil "wolverine". In this episode, the characters' instruments are: Buster Bunny, a trumpet; Babs Bunny, a harp; Furrball, a violin; Sweetie, a flute; Hamton J. Pig, a tuba; Plucky Duck, a bike horn (later, bagpipes, then an organ, and finally a synthesizer); and the wolverine, drums.
 Peter Schickele (a.k.a. P. D. Q. Bach) wrote an alternate, comedic text for the score entitled Sneaky Pete and the Wolf, converting the story into a Western, including a showdown between Sneaky Pete and the gunslinger El Lobo (which never happens due to some local boys' giving El Lobo a hotfoot and sticking a paper airplane in his eye, and Sneaky Pete's girlfriend Laura rendering El Lobo unconscious with a vacuum cleaner). It was recorded with the Atlanta Symphony Orchestra, conducted by Yoel Levi, in 1993.
 In the 1993 Simpsons episode "Krusty Gets Kancelled", guest star Hugh Hefner plays a portion of Peter and the Wolf on wine glasses.
 In 1995, a 45-minute television special was made with a mix of live-action, animation, and characters from the story designed by Chuck Jones. The film featured Kirstie Alley (as the narrator), Lloyd Bridges (as the grandfather), and Ross Malinger (as Peter), in a live-action "wraparound" segment. The version debuted on ABC on 8 December 1995. This version keeps the duck-friendly ending by having the swallowed duck pop out of the wolf's mouth alive, well, and dancing as the wolf is being captured. The wolf, described as "not a ballet fan", grabs the duck again before being forced to drop him by the hunters. As the story ends, Peter finds the duck crouching at the pond's edge, shivering and frightened because of his terrible experience, and Peter reassures it that he will always be there to protect it. This version even places the bird as a mother, with six eggs that hatch near the ending. The music for this version was performed by the RCA Victor Symphony Orchestra conducted by George Daugherty. The version received a 1996 Primetime Emmy Award for Outstanding Children's Program and received a second Emmy nomination for Daugherty, for Outstanding Music Direction. Daugherty (also one of the writers) and Janis Diamond received a Writers Guild of America Award nomination for the script. The production received a Gold Hugo and Silver Hugo at Chicago International Film Festival.
 During September 1996, Coldcut (a duo of scratch/mix DJs from south London) released a scratch version of the main theme, included on the track "More Beats + Pieces", from their album Let Us Play!.
Matthew Hart choreographed Peter and the Wolf for television in 1997, performed by the dancers of the Royal Ballet School and narrated by Sir Anthony Dowell (who also danced the role of "The Grandfather").

2000s
 In 2001, National Public Radio produced Peter and the Wolf: A Special Report, which treats the familiar plot as if it were a developing news story. Robert Siegel, Linda Wertheimer, Ann Taylor, and Steve Inskeep of NPR's All Things Considered report on the event against a performance of the score by the Virginia Symphony Orchestra conducted by JoAnn Falletta.
 Sesame Workshop produced a version with Sesame Street characters in 2000, as told by way of a trip to a Boston Pops Orchestra concert. Dubbed "Elmo's Musical Adventure", the story unfolds inside Baby Bear's imagination as he attends a performance with Papa Bear, conducted by Keith Lockhart. In the story, Peter is played by Elmo, the cat by Oscar the Grouch, the duck by Telly Monster, the bird by Zoe, the grandfather by Big Bird, and the hunters by the Two-Headed Monster. Each character is followed around by a soloist playing that character's instrument, but Telly Monster's "Duck" quits the story after learning the wolf eats the duck. (He returns as one of the hunters later.)
 In February 2004, ex-president Bill Clinton, Mikhail Gorbachev, and Sophia Loren won a Grammy Award for Best Spoken Word Album for Children for narrating the album Peter and the Wolf/Wolf Tracks. This recording was performed by the Russian National Orchestra conducted by Kent Nagano and included Loren narrating Peter and the Wolf and Clinton narrating The Wolf and Peter by Jean-Pascal Beintus, which is also a narrated orchestral piece, but the story is told from the perspective of the wolf and has the theme of letting animals live in peace.
 In 2004, Russian model Tatiana Sorokko narrated an arrangement of Beintus' Wolf Tracks with musicians from the Russian National Orchestra on tour in the United States.
 In 2004, the Shirim Klezmer Orchestra recorded a klezmer version of Peter and the Wolf, called Pincus and the Pig: A Klezmer Tale. The recording was narrated by Maurice Sendak and featured his illustrations.
 In 2005, theatre organist Jelani Eddington performed and recorded with narrator George Woods the only existing theatre organ adaptation of Peter and the Wolf.
 Psy-trance artist Eliad Grundland released a musical interpretation of the work, as Space Buddha, titled "Land of The Wolves", on his album Full Circle (2006).
 In 2006, Neil Tobin produced a Halloween-themed narrative called Peter and the Werewolf with the Melbourne Symphony Orchestra, John Lanchbery conducting.
 In 2009, an Angelina Ballerina: The Next Steps episode named "Angelina's Musical Day", Angelina and her friends do a school play of Peter and the Wolf.
 In 2009, musical group Project Trio released their second studio album, Brooklyn, on which a modernized version of the story was recorded. All three members narrate.

2010s
 In 2010, Denver musicians Munly and the Lupercalians released Petr & the Wulf, an alternative take on the original story told from the different perspectives of all the characters: Grandfater, Petr, Scarewulf, Cat, Bird, The Three Hunters, Duk, and Wulf. Released on the Alternative Tentacles label.
 In 2012, ITV used a version of the main theme as the title music for their coverage of the European Football Championships, because Prokofiev was born in present-day Ukraine, one of the host countries.
In 2013, filmmaker Wes Hurley premiered his short film Peter and the Wolf – a graphic adult version of the story featuring Peter as a gay werewolf-hunter and imagery inspired by Tom of Finland.
 In 2015, a recording was done on the Walt Disney Concert Hall organ, arranged by Josh Perschbacher, and narrated by Michael Barone (host of the radio program Pipedreams from American Public Media).
 In 2015, the New England Jazz Ensemble (with the Wallingford Symphony Orchestra) debuted pianist Walter Gwardyak's jazz arrangement of Peter and the Wolf for big band. The narration was written and performed by vocalist Giacomo Gates. The recording was self-released on April 22, 2018.
 In 2019, composer Lior Navok released Brave Little Timmy for narrator and orchestra (same instrumentation as Peter and the Wolf). The libretto, written by the composer, tells the story of Timmy, whose distant friendship with a wolf has saved the latter from the hunters.

In copyright law
In 2012, the US Supreme Court's decision in Golan v. Holder restored copyright protection in the United States to numerous foreign works that had entered the public domain. Peter and the Wolf was frequently cited by the parties and amici, as well as by the Court's opinion and by the press, as an example of a well-known work that would be removed from the public domain by the decision. The restored copyright per current law is 95 years after publication. Therefore the piece is expected to enter the public domain on December 31, 2031.

References
Notes

Sources

External links

 
 Gramophone: Prokofiev's Peter and the Wolf – which recording is best?
 A list of the instruments and the story
 Peter and the Wolf in Brooklyn (December 2008)
 
 Michael Biel: "The Recordings of Peter and the Wolf" in Three Oranges, No. 12: November 2006, Serge Prokofiev Foundation; retrieved 23 May 2009.

 
Children's music
Compositions by Sergei Prokofiev
Compositions with a narrator
1936 compositions
Fictional wolves
Big Bad Wolf